Colobothea grisescens is a species of beetle in the family Cerambycidae. It was described by Zajciw in 1962. It is known from Brazil.

References

grisescens
Beetles described in 1962